Hit-and-Run Squad is a South Korean action police procedural film. It is directed by Han Jun-hee and stars Gong Hyo-jin, Ryu Jun-yeol and Jo Jung-suk. The film was released on January 30, 2019.

Synopsis 
A hit-and-run police task force chases an out-of-control businessman who loves to speed.

Cast

Main 
 Gong Hyo-jin as Eun Si-yeon
  An elite police officer who is fierce when hunting for criminals. Due to an unforeseen event, Si-yeon who was once a part of an internal investigations unit alongside the brightest of the force, is relegated to a hit-and-run task force, where she takes to running down criminals with the same passion.
 Ryu Jun-yeol   as Seo Min-jae
 The youngest of the task force, but also the ace, with a natural instinct when it comes to cars. Sporting unruly hair, glasses, and a flip phone, he is easy to underestimate, but a persistent investigator.
 Jo Jung-suk as Jung Jae-cheol
 A rich businessman living it up at parties and having a boyishly good time playing with cars on the race track.

Supporting 
 Yum Jung-ah as Yoo Ji-hyun
 She is Eun Si-yeon's superior at the regional investigation unit. 
 Jeon Hye-jin  as Woo Sun-young
 The reliable chief of the hit-and-run task force
 Son Suk-ku as Ki Tae-ho
 Key as Dong Soo
 The driver of a tow truck always arrives on the scene immediately after a hit-and-run.
 Park Hyung-soo as Choi Kyung-joon
 Lee Sung-min as Min-jae's adoptive father
 Kim Go-eun as Seo Min-jae's acquaintance (cameo appearance)
 Lee Hak-joo as Ga Reu-ma
 Ryu Kyung-soo as a traffic policeman.

Production
Lee Je-hoon was initially offered a lead role but had declined the offer.

The first script reading took place on the March 5 and filming began on March 11, 2018.

Awards and nominations

References

External links 
 

2010s Korean-language films
2019 action films
South Korean action films
2019 films
2010s police films
2010s South Korean films